Vysočina, meaning "highlands" in Czech, may refer to places in the Czech Republic:

Vysočina Region, a region
Vysočina (Chrudim District), a municipality in the Pardubice Region
FC Vysočina Jihlava, a football club